Brice Etès (born 11 April 1984 in Monaco) is a Monégasque athlete of French descent who is a middle-distance specialist.

Career 
He holds the national record in Monaco 1:47.61, reached at the 2010 IAAF Diamond League which was held in Monaco (9th), but his personal time is 1:47.03, obtained in 2008 when he did not yet hold Monegasque nationality.

He qualified for the semifinals of the 800m at the 2010 European Athletics Championships after the fall of many opponents in his series. He won the Games of the Small States of Europe in 2005, 2007, 2011 (4th in 2009). He represented Monaco at the 2011 World Championships which was held in Daegu, South Korea, where he was eliminated in the heats.

He competed in the men's 800 m event at the 2016 Summer Olympics in Rio de Janeiro. He finished 8th in his heat with a time of 1:50.40 and did not qualify for the semifinals. He was the flagbearer for Monaco during the Parade of Nations.

Competition record

References 

 
 Official website
 Fiche de carrière sur www.athle.org

1984 births
Living people
Monegasque male sprinters
Monegasque male middle-distance runners
Olympic athletes of Monaco
Athletes (track and field) at the 2012 Summer Olympics
Athletes (track and field) at the 2016 Summer Olympics
World Athletics Championships athletes for Monaco
Athletes (track and field) at the 2015 European Games
Athletes (track and field) at the 2013 Mediterranean Games
European Games competitors for Monaco
Mediterranean Games competitors for Monaco